Girlfriends was a women's magazine that provided critical coverage of culture, entertainment and world events from a lesbian perspective. It was founded by the couple Jacob and Diane Anderson-Minshall, and Heather Findlay. It also offered relationship, health and travel advice. Published monthly from San Francisco since 1993, it was distributed nationwide by Disticor. It had the same publisher as lesbian erotica magazine On Our Backs, but distanced itself from its pornographic counterpart by refusing to carry sexual ads. Girlfriends magazine ceased publication in 2006.

One of the major features of the magazine was its annual list on the best cities for a lesbian to live in, which it began publishing in 1994. The magazine also ran an online personals service through its website while it was still in operation.

See also
LGBT culture in San Francisco

Notes

LGBT-related magazines published in the United States
Monthly magazines published in the United States
Defunct women's magazines published in the United States
Lesbian-related magazines
Magazines established in 1993
Magazines disestablished in 2006
Magazines published in San Francisco